The 1973 Sanremo Rally (formally the 11th Rally Sanremo) was the tenth round of the inaugural World Rally Championship season.  Run in mid-October around Sanremo, Italy, the rally was a mixed surface rally, with some stages on tarmac and others on gravel.  Sanremo would become a staple of the WRC calendar for many years until the Italian portion of the WRC was moved to the gravel stages of Sardinia in 2004.

Report 
In 1973, and for several years afterward, only manufacturers were given points for finishes in WRC events.  Italy marked the official sealing of the manufacturer title for Alpine Renault with their win, despite only needing three points to accomplish the task.  Fiat also finished strong on their home event, all but ensuring their place in the final classifications as well.  Strong presence in the top ten for both teams minimized the opportunity for other manufacturers to gather points in the event, with only Lancia and Opel picking up some crumbs.

Results 

Source: Independent WRC archive

Championship standings after the event

References

External links

 Official website of the World Rally Championship
 1973 San Remo Rally at Rallye-info 

Sanremo
Sanremo Rally
1973 in Italian motorsport